The National Library of Libya is the national library of Libya, located in Benghazi. It holds 150,000 volumes. The national librarian is Mohamed A Eshoweihde.

History 
The national library was established in 1972, and holds books and scientific publications, theses and local periodicals. It contains rare books and reports issued by official government bodies, as well as archival documents that date several decades.

See also 
 National Archives of Libya
 List of national and state libraries

References

External links 
National Library of Libya

1972 establishments in Libya
Buildings and structures in Benghazi
Libya
Libraries in Libya
Libraries established in 1972